The Wall: Growing Up Behind the Iron Curtain is a children's book written and illustrated by Peter Sís. It received both the American Library Association's Caldecott Honor and ALA's 2008 Robert Silbert Medal for the most distinguished informational book for young readers. It is a memoir on Sís's life under the Communist rule of Czechoslovakia, the oppression he faces and his dreams of leaving for America.  The book mentions adult topics such as Laika, Prague Spring and Plastic People of the Universe. This book is about a boy who grew up on the Communist side of the Iron Curtain during the Cold War.

References

2007 children's books
American picture books
Children's history books
Caldecott Honor-winning works
Books about Czechoslovakia
Books about communism